Kim In-jik(金仁直), better known by Gamst (born January 8, 1990) is a South Korean YouTuber and live streamer.

Career 
Gamst began broadcasting on AfreecaTV on FIFA Online 2 BJ in February 2012. The nickname "Gamst" is derived from Norwegian footballer Morten Gamst Pedersen. In late 2013, he stopped broadcasting on his own to take the comedian test, but in 2015, he gave up the comedian test and returned to broadcasting on his own. Since 2016, he has recruited members such as Chang-geun and Hwan-gyong to Gam Company and won the AfreecaTV Grand Prize through visible radio content.

He was recruited as a goodwill ambassador for the K-League ahead of the 2018 season. Since being appointed as a goodwill ambassador for the K-League, he conducted contents such as joint broadcasting with soccer players, visiting K-League stadiums, and participating in K-League commentary. He was a digital commentator for Munhwa Broadcasting Corporation (MBC) at the 2018 FIFA World Cup and the 2018 Asian Games. Gamst won a special award at the 2018 K-League Awards, showing such vigorous activities in the football field. He has also appeared on terrestrial broadcasting since 2018, appearing as a guest of the entertainment Radio Star, and as a cameo of drama Secrets and Lies. He also participated in the Real Man 300 - Special Warfare School. For such activities, Gamst won the 2018 MBC Entertainment Awards for Best New Male Artist in Variety.

Prior to the 2019 season, he continued to serve as ambassador for the K-League. On 26 March 2019, he participated in a friendly match between the South Korea national football team and the Colombia national football team. However, Gamst was criticized for his poor broadcasting skills and apologized after the end of the match, acknowledging his lack of skills. In April 2019, Afreeca TV BJs, Oejilhye, Namsoon and Narakz, formed a crew. However, in June 2019, Narakz caused a sexual harassment case, and Gamst apologized for it and dropped out of the K-League promotional ambassador program and went into self-reflection. He returned in August 2019, two months later. After his return to the club, he has been mostly involved in League of Legends content.

See Also 
 Lilka

References

External links 
 Gamst's broadcasting station on AfreecaTV
 

1990 births
Living people
South Korean YouTubers
Gaming-related YouTube channels
Gaming YouTubers
South Korean association football commentators
People from Jangseong County
Gwangsan Kim clan
AfreecaTV streamers